WENE (1430 AM) is a radio station broadcasting a sports format. Licensed to Endicott, New York, United States, the station serves the Binghamton market. The station is owned and operated by iHeartMedia and features programming from Premiere Radio Networks, Westwood One and Fox Sports Radio. During its top 40/rock heyday, from the early 1960s through 1975, WENE, under the ownership of Merv Griffin's January Enterprises, was home to many nationally famous talent such as Johnny Donovan, Greaseman, Bob Savage, Dave "Roe" Mason, Ray Ross, Michael J. Raymond, Charlie Burger and Fred "Bumper Morgan" Merrin.

References

External links

ENE
IHeartMedia radio stations